Royal Air Force Wittering or more simply RAF Wittering  is a Royal Air Force station within the unitary authority area of Peterborough, Cambridgeshire and the unitary authority area of North Northamptonshire. Although Stamford in Lincolnshire is the nearest town, the runways of RAF Wittering cross the boundary between Cambridgeshire and Northamptonshire.

History

First World War
Wittering's use as a military airfield dates back to 5 May 1916 when it began as RFC Stamford. The aerodrome was initially created for A Flight of No. 38 (Home Defence) Squadron.  In common with other Home Defence squadrons at the time it was used for training during the day and for air defence at night. From the flight's operational declaration in December 1916 until it deployed to France in November 1917, its BE2cs, RE7s, and FE2bs were involved in anti-Zeppelin patrols.

The station's training role expanded when it became the Royal Flying Corps's No.1 Training Depot Station in 1917. The neighbouring airfield, RFC Easton on the Hill, also dates back to 1916 and it became No. 5 Training Depot Station in 1917. Following the formation of the Royal Air Force, Easton on the Hill became RAF Collyweston on 1 April 1918. Stamford was retitled at RAF Wittering on 10 April 1918.

Interwar period

Flying Training  
RAF Wittering officially reopened in 1924 following an Air Defence Review in 1923. A significant amount of development took place to re-open the station including four new accommodation blocks for airmen, a corporals and airmen's institute, a Senior Non-Commissioned Officers' Mess, the Officers' Mess, and a new guardroom.  The station retained two aircraft hangars from 1917 and an aircraft repair shed.  The Central Flying School was at Wittering from 1926 until 1935 being replaced by No. 11 Flying Training School until 1938.

Preparation for War – Fighter Command 
In April 1938, the station became a Fighter Command station within No 12 Group.  This conversion required another expansion with more land being purchased to the south and east of the station which closed the Stamford to Oundle road. Further airmen's accommodation, airmen's mess, technical accommodation and station headquarters were constructed as was a sector control room to control fighter squadrons and anti-aircraft gun batteries within 12 Group's 'K' Sector.  The airfield was enhanced with the construction of three new Type C (1934 variant) hangars.

Second World War 
During the Second World War, the station was very active during the Battle of Britain and the Blitz in 1940–41 in No. 12 Group (controlled from RAF Watnall in Nottingham) as it was the main fighter station for a lot of the southern East Midlands, and fighters from the station would often patrol as far as Birmingham.  During the Battle of Britain many squadrons were rotated through Wittering to spells in the south of England with No. 11 Group that was bearing the brunt of the battle.  With many of the Luftwaffe raids during the Blitz taking part at night, Wittering-based squadrons were instrumental in the development of night combat techniques. These included the use of the Turbinlite aircraft which replaced the nose with a powerful searchlight insulated in the nose of Havocs and Bostons. In April 1943 No. 141 Squadron were moved in, operating de Havilland Mosquitoes.   1943 also saw the station host 2 USAAF squadrons, albeit temporarily: 63 Fighter Squadron USAAF with its P47s operated from Wittering between January and March before moving to RAF Horsham St Faith; 55 Fighter Squadron operated its P38s and P51s from Wittering between August and March 1944 before moving to nearby RAF Kingscliffe.

Emergency landing ground K3 was renamed as Collyweston Landing Ground in 1940 with the construction of some blister hangars, a perimeter track and some dispersals, although the next main fighter station further north was RAF Coleby Grange. Embry in Mission Completed states that in 1940 (the station's official history indicates that this was actually in 1941), while used by 25 squadron, equipped with Beaufighter night fighters, the runway was extended from 1,400 yards to 3 miles long to reduce landing accidents at night and in bad weather.

The Station's innovative role continued and developed throughout the war.  It became the home of both fighter and gunnery research and development units working with new equipment and techniques.  In addition, No. 1426 (Captured Enemy Aircraft) Flight (colloquially known as the RAFwaffe) was based at Collyweston Landing Ground with its wide range of captured Luftwaffe aircraft both evaluating their performance and touring allied bases. In January 1945, the captured enemy aircraft were removed.

During the war, the airfield was bombed five times, with seventeen people being killed on 14 March 1941. Aircraft from the station downed 151 Luftwaffe aeroplanes and 89 V-1 flying bombs. Hugh Jenkins, Baron Jenkins of Putney served at the station, as did Andrew Humphrey (later Chief of the Defence Staff from 1976 to 1977, who flew Supermarine Spitfires with 266 Squadron).

Post-war use

Bomber Command 
Immediately after the war RAF Wittering, once again, transferred back to Fighter Command in 1946 providing a home to a variety of squadrons operating Spitfires, Mosquitos and Hornets.  In 1948, the Station transferred back to Training Command for 2 years before Maintenance Command took responsibility to undertake some significant redevelopment between 1950 and 1952 as the Cold War saw RAF Wittering become a vital part of the United Kingdom's strategic nuclear deterrent under the control of Bomber Command in 1953.

The current airfield was created by the merging of RAF Wittering and nearby Collyweston Relief Landing Ground, by the construction of a 1.7-mile runway between them in 1941.  Conversion to a Bomber airfield saw the construction of a new concrete runway (slightly to the south of the 1941 runway), taxiways and dispersals (with further H-dispersals and QRA dispersals being added later) that still form the majority of the Station's aircraft operating surfaces.  A wide-span Gaydon hangar for the Canberra B2 bombers was constructed along with a new control tower, avionics building and nuclear storage and maintenance facilities.

In its new guise as a bomber station, RAF Wittering initially operated Avro Lincolns from 1953 although these were replaced by English Electric Canberras later that year. The first British operational atomic bomb, the Blue Danube, was deployed to RAF Wittering in November 1953. The first V-bombers (the Vickers Valiant, the Handley Page Victor and the Avro Vulcan) were delivered in July 1955. In 1957–58 tests were carried out on the first British hydrogen bomb. This was fitted into the existing Blue Danube casing, and four Valiant bombers flew out of Wittering to Christmas Island in the Pacific, one of them dropping the first device on 15 May 1957 on Operation Grapple.

Until January 1969 two squadrons (100 and 139) of Victor B.2 bombers equipped with Blue Steel stand-off missiles were part of the QRA (Quick Reaction Alert) force of the RAF. Two nuclear armed aircraft were permanently on 15 minutes readiness to take off. They were parked within  of the westerly runway threshold. In times of higher tension, four bombers could be stationed beside the runway on the ORP (Operational Readiness Platform). If the aircraft were manned they could all be airborne within 30 seconds, a feat often demonstrated at V force stations across the country. Since the incoming missile warning from the RAF Fylingdales BMEWS array was only four minutes before impact this ensured if the country came under attack, the bombers would be scrambled and able to retaliate.

In 1968, the base became part of Strike Command. From October 1972 until August 1976, there were two squadrons flying the Hawker Hunter No. 45 Squadron initially and then 58 Squadron as well.

Harriers
From 1968 the station was known as the Home of the Harrier: the first Harriers arrived for No. 1(Fighter) Squadron in August 1969.

In May 1971, four aircraft from 1(F) Sqn operated from HMS Ark Royal, the first time the Harrier had operated from an aircraft carrier, under Wing Commander (later Sir) Kenneth Hayr, later killed at the Biggin Hill airshow on 2 June 2001.

In 1982, six Harrier GR3 aircraft were taken down to the Falklands on SS Atlantic Conveyor, and survived the Exocet attack, later to board HMS Hermes in May 1982. In June 1982, 12 GR3 aircraft were flown from Wittering, via RAF Ascension Island and mid-air refuelling with Victor tankers, on an 8,000-mile journey to the Falklands in 17 hours, which set an RAF record. The Harriers were from 1(F) Sqn. On 27 May 1982, Sqn Ldr (later Gp Capt) Bob Iveson was hit by anti-aircraft fire from GADA 601's 35mm cannon, and he ejected seconds before his aircraft exploded in mid-air near Goose Green. He evaded capture for two and a half days before being rescued by helicopter.

The Queen visited the station in June 1982 as part of the RAF Regiment's 40th anniversary celebrations.

It was announced in December 2009 that RAF Wittering was to become the sole operational base for the Harriers of Joint Force Harrier after the announcement that RAF Cottesmore was to close. However, as a result of the 2010 Strategic Defence and Security Review, the Harrier fleet was withdrawn in December 2010.

In March 2019, the Ministry of Defence indicated that RAF Wittering, alongside RAF Waddington and RAF Leeming, was being considered as the future home of the RAF Aerobatic Team the Red Arrows. In May 2020 however it was confirmed that the team would move to Waddington.

Role and operations
In 2016 the Ministry of Defence confirmed that the Station would be one of the RAF's 'well found centres of specialisation for' 'Support Enablers' along with RAF Leeming.

Command 
The station is part of No 2 Group. The station commander of RAF Wittering is currently Wing Commander Jeremy Case who assumed command from Group Captain Jo Lincoln on 10 June 2021. The station's honorary air commodore is Her Royal Highness the Countess of Wessex.

Royal Air Force Engineering and Logistics Support Enablers 
The station is the home of the 'A4 Force' (the Royal Air Force's engineering and logistic Air Combat Service Support Units (ACSSUs)).

Flying Training 
Previously the home of No 1 Training Depot Station (at Stamford aerodrome) and No 5 Training Depot Station (at Easton on the Hill aerodrome) of the Royal Flying Corps during World War 1 and then the Royal Air Force's Central Flying School and No. 11 Flying Training School between the World Wars.  RAF Wittering's return to flying training was marked on 4 February 2015 with the arrival of Cambridge University Air Squadron and the University of London Air Squadron. RAF Wittering is also the birthplace of the Royal Air Force Gliding & Soaring Association's Four Counties Gliding Club.

Royal Engineers 
In November 2011 the Ministry of Defence announced that 44 Service personnel from HQ 12 (Air Support) Engineer Group, part of the Royal Engineers, would move from Waterbeach Barracks to RAF Wittering in 2012–13.

Current units 
Current flying and notable non-flying units based at RAF Wittering.

Royal Air Force

No. 2 Group RAF 
 A4 Force
 Headquarters A4 Force
 Headquarters and elements of No. 42 (Expeditionary Support) Wing
 No. 71 (Inspection and Repair) Squadron
 Elements of No. 93 (Expeditionary Armament) Squadron
 No. 5001 Squadron
 Headquarters and elements of No. 85 (Expeditionary Logistics) Wing
 No. 1 Expeditionary Logistics Squadron
 No. 2 Mechanical Transport Squadron
 No. 3 Mobile Catering Squadron
 An element of the Reserve Logistics Support Wing
No. 504 (County of Nottingham) Squadron Royal Auxiliary Air Force

No. 22 Group 
 An element of No. 3 Flying Training School
 No. 16 Squadron – Grob Tutor T1
 Headquarters and elements of South Wing, No. 6 Flying Training School
No. 115 Squadron – Grob Tutor T1
 University of London Air Squadron – Grob Tutor T1
 Cambridge University Air Squadron – Grob Tutor T1
 No. 5 Air Experience Flight – Grob Tutor T1
 Air Training Corps
 Headquarters South & East Midlands Wing

British Army

Royal Engineers (8 Engineer Brigade) 
 Headquarters 12 (Force Support) Engineer Group
 Headquarters and elements of 20 Works Group Royal Engineers (Air Support), 170 (Infrastructure Support) Engineer Group 
 529 Specialist Team Royal Engineers (Airfields) (STRE)
 532 Specialist Team Royal Engineers (Airfields) (STRE)

RAF A4 Force 
The Station Commander RAF Wittering used to also be the commander of RAF's A4 Force Elements. In 2021, Group Captain Nick Huntley took over command of the A4 Force. Command of the station is now separate from command of the A4 Force.  These combine the majority the RAF's specialist and deployable engineering and logistics units within a single organisation as follows (A4 Force Elements not located at RAF Wittering are included in italics for completeness)

Units

Station commanders
The station commanders have been:

 Group Captain Dudley Radford 1948
 Group Captain John Woodroffe 1955-57
 Group Captain Sir Alan Boxer 1958-9
 Group Captain Leonard Trent 1959–62
 Group Captain John Lawrence 1962-4
 Group Captain Paul Mallorie 1964-9
 Group Captain Peter Williamson 1969–70
 Group Captain Alan Merriman 1970-2
 Group Captain IH Kepple 1972–
 Group Captain Laurence Jones 1975-6
 Group Captain David Brook 1976-8
 Group Captain AG Bridges 1978–1981
 Group Captain P King 1981–1983
 Group Captain Peter Dodworth March 1983– February 1985
 Group Captain Peter Millar February 1985– 1986
 Group Captain John Feesey 1986-8
 Group Captain John Thompson 1988–1990
 Group Captain Syd Morris 1990–1992 
 Group Captain PW Day AFC 1992–1995
 Group Captain J Connolly 1995-7
 Group Captain Chris Moran 1997-9
 Group Captain David Haward 1998
 Group Captain Andre Dezonie 1999–2001
 Group Captain A Kirkpatrick 2001-3
 Group Captain M Jenkins 2003-5
 Group Captain Ashley Stevenson 2005 – November 2006
 Group Captain Rowena Atherton November 2006 – June 2008
 Group Captain Paul Higgins June 2008 – December 2009
 Group Captain Richard Knighton December 2009 – June 2011
 Group Captain Richard Hill June 2011 – June 2013
 Group Captain Damian Alexander June 2013 – June 2015
 Group Captain Richard Pratley June 2015 – June 2017
 Group Captain Tony Keeling June 2017 – August 2019
 Group Captain Jo Lincoln August 2019 – June 2021
 Wing Commander Jeremy Case June 2021 – February 2023
 Wing Commander Nicola Duncan February 2023 –

Freedoms
RAF Wittering has received the Freedom of several locations throughout its history; these include:
  1983: Peterborough.

See also
 List of Royal Air Force stations

Notes

References

Sources

External links

 
 UK Military Aeronautical Information Publication – Wittering (EGXT)
 Wittering View – station magazine

Royal Air Force stations in Cambridgeshire
Royal Air Force stations of World War II in the United Kingdom
Buildings and structures in Peterborough
Military units and formations established in 1924
1924 establishments in England
1924 establishments in the United Kingdom
Peterborough
North Northamptonshire